Peter Shields may refer to:

 Peter Joseph Shields (1862–1962), helped found the University of California at Davis and superior court judge for the State of California
 Peter Shields (footballer) (born 1960), Scottish football player
 Peter Shields (cricketer) (born 1979), Irish cricketer

See also
 Pete Shields (1891–1961), American baseball player